is a Japanese football player. He plays for SC Sagamihara.

Career
Seiya Yamaguchi joined Japanese Regional Leagues club Saurcos Fukui in 2016. In 2017, he moved to J3 League club SC Sagamihara.

Club statistics
Updated to 22 February 2018.

References

External links

1993 births
Living people
Kanto Gakuin University alumni
People from Zama, Kanagawa
Association football people from Kanagawa Prefecture
Japanese footballers
J3 League players
SC Sagamihara players
Saurcos Fukui players
Association football defenders